Kitabatake (written: 北畠 lit. "north terraced field") is a Japanese surname. Notable people with the surname include:

, Japanese kuge
, Japanese warlord
, Japanese kuge and writer
, Japanese archer
, Japanese poet and writer

Japanese-language surnames